The Boheh Stone, also called St. Patrick's Chair. is a piece of rock art a and National Monument located in County Mayo, Ireland.

Location

The Boheh Stone lies 6.4 km (4 mi) SSW of Westport.

History

The stone is believed to have been carved as early as 3800 BC.

This stone was later Christianised and called St Patrick's Chair. It was made a waypoint on Tóchar Phádraig, a pilgrimage route; formerly this path led from Rathcroghan to Croagh Patrick.

The "rolling sun" phenomenon was rediscovered in 1989–92 by Gerry Bracken. A new panel of carving was found in 2014 by Michael Gibbons.

Description

The Boheh Stone is one of the finest examples of Neolithic rock art in Ireland, covered in many cup and ring marks and keyhole motifs; about 250 petroglyphs in total. It is a natural outcrop flecked with quartz.

Rolling sun
Twice a year (18 April and 24 August by the Gregorian calendar), from the vantage point at the Boheh Stone, the sun can be seen to set at the summit of Croagh Patrick (7.1 km / 4.4 mi to the WNW) and appears to roll down its northern shoulder.

References

Archaeological sites in County Mayo
National Monuments in County Mayo
Petroglyphs